Cena (or Cenas) is a small village in Jelgava Municipality in the Semigallia region of Latvia (from 2009 until 2021, it was part of the former Ozolnieki Municipality). The village located at Misa River approximately 32 km from the capital Riga and 10 km from the city of Jelgava.

References

Jelgava Municipality
Towns and villages in Latvia
Semigallia